Jacqueline "Jacqui" Frazier-Lyde (born Jacqueline Frazier; December 2, 1961) is an American lawyer and former professional boxer. She is the daughter of former world Heavyweight boxing champion Joe Frazier. In January 2000, at the age of 38, Frazier announced that she would begin participating in the sport of women's boxing.

Education and Career 
Throughout her high school career at Plymouth-Whitemarsh, Frazier became a student athlete in softball, basketball, lacrosse, and hockey. Frazier received a scholarship to American University in Washington D.C., where she played basketball and majored in Justice. Frazier earned her Juris Doctor at Villanova University, and after graduating practiced law and later opened her own firm. In 2008, Frazier was elected as a municipal court judge in Philadelphia.

Boxing Rivalry and Other Matches 
Inspired by Laila Ali's participation in the sport and eager to avenge the losses her father suffered at the hands of Ali's father, Muhammad Ali in two of their three fights, Frazier-Lyde began her career on February 6, 2000, knocking out Teela Reese in first round.

Laila Ali was 9-0 (8 knockouts) and Jacqui Frazier-Lyde was 7-0 (7 knockouts) when they starred on the first Pay Per View boxing card ever to be headlined by women. At 39 years of age, Frazier-Lyde was 16 years older than Ali. The bout was nicknamed Ali-Frazier IV by the media in allusion to their fathers' trilogy of fights in 1971, 1974, and 1975. It was boxed on June 8, 2001 to headline the weekend activities of the International Boxing Hall Of Fame induction ceremonies. Ali won the fight by a majority decision (79–73, 77–75, 76–76).

On December 14, 2001, Frazier-Lyde won the WIBA Light Heavyweight Title with a fourth round TKO win over Suzette Taylor in Philadelphia, with Joe and Jacqui becoming the first father-daughter world champions in boxing. She added the WIBF Intercontinental Super Middleweight title on July 27, 2002, with a third round TKO win over Heidi Hartmann. Frazier-Lyde successfully defended her WIBF Intercontinental Super Middleweight title on two occasions, defeating Kendra Lenhart and Shirvelle Williams by unanimous decisions, the latter by an 80–72 shut-out on all three judges' scorecards. Lenhart and Williams, along with Frazier-Lyde, are the only three women to have taken Laila Ali (24–0, with 21 knockouts) the distance in boxing fights.

Frazier-Lyde's last two fights were in the Heavyweight division, with her opponent on August 31, 2004, Carley Pesente, weighing in at 213lbs, thus being the heaviest opponent that Frazier-Lyde had faced during her boxing career. Frazier-Lyde won the fight by a shut-out unanimous decision (40–36, 40–36, 40–36). On September 10, 2004, Frazier-Lyde won the UBA World Heavyweight title by unanimous decision (97–92, 96–92, 95–93) against Mary Ann Almager, despite Frazier-Lyde being knocked down twice by Almager for the only times in her career. This fight was to be Frazier-Lyde's last boxing fight.

Frazier-Lyde ended her career with a record of 13 wins, 9 by knockout, and 1 loss.

Professional boxing record
13 Wins (9 knockouts, 4 decisions), 1 Loss (0 knockouts, 1 decision), 0 Draws, 1 No Contest

For WIBF Intercontinental Super Middleweight title
For WIBF Intercontinental Super Middleweight title

References

External links
 Official website
 
 Women Boxing profile

1961 births
Sportspeople from Beaufort, South Carolina
Pennsylvania lawyers
American women boxers
American women lawyers
American lawyers
Boxers from Pennsylvania
Living people
Super-middleweight boxers
World boxing champions
21st-century American women